American Locomotive Company (ALCO) produced a wide range of diesel-electric locomotives until it ceased manufacture in 1969.

Boxcab locomotives

Switchers

Cab units

Four-axle road switchers

Six-axle road switchers

Century series 
ALCO announced its "Century Series" of diesel locomotives in 1963 as a leap forward in power and reliability, an attempt to compete more aggressively with GM-EMD and GE in the marketplace.

Diesel-hydraulic locomotives

Military locomotives

Locomotives export and not exported

Montreal Locomotive Works Export locomotives

References

External links

 ALCOWorld

 ALCo
ALCO diesel locomotives